Huma County (Manchu: Hūmar Siyan) is a county in the far north of the Heilongjiang province, People's Republic of China. The county seat is located on the right (southwestern) bank of the Amur River, a few kilometers upstream from the fall of the Huma River (formerly also known as Houmar) into the Amur. 
It is under the administration of the Daxing'anling Prefecture.

The opposite side of the Amur River is in Amurskaya Oblast', Russia, where there is a village with the same name in Russified form, Kumara

History 

Kumarsk, the predecessor of the present-day Huma, was a fortified Russian town in the Amur River region, founded in 1652 by Yerofey Khabarov and his companions, during his retreat from Achansk, corresponding to the present-day Khabarovsk, where he was besieged by Manchu and Daur allied forces.

On 13 March 1655, the Komar fortress, defended by the ataman Onufriy Stepanov and his 500 Cossacks, was besieged by a Qing army led by Ming'andali consisting of 10,000 men. The outnumbered defenders repulsed several assaults. The defeated Manchu lift the siege the following month (on 3 April 1655). The town was ceded to Qing Empire after the treaty of Nerchinsk in 1689.

Administrative divisions 
Huma County is divided into 2 towns, 5 townships and 1 ethnic township. 
2 towns
 Huma
 Hanjiayuan
5 townships

1 ethnic township
 Baiyinna Oroqen

Climate
Huma County has a monsoon-influenced humid continental climate (Köppen Dwb) with very warm, humid summers and severely cold, extremely dry winters. More than 70% of the annual precipitation occurs from June to September. With monthly percent possible sunshine ranging from 52% in July and December to 73% in February, sunshine is generous and the area receives 2,595 hours of bright sunshine annually.

References

External links
 Map of Huma County
 https://web.archive.org/web/20070511004246/http://www.epicbook.com/history/nibucu.html

County level divisions of Heilongjiang